Denmark was represented by Dario Campeotto, with the song "Angelique", at the 1961 Eurovision Song Contest, which took place on 18 March in Cannes, France. "Angelique" was chosen as the Danish entry at the Dansk Melodi Grand Prix on 19 February.

Before Eurovision

Dansk Melodi Grand Prix 1961
The DMGP was held at the Fredericia Theatre in Fredericia, hosted by Sejr Volmer-Sørensen. Seven songs took part, with the winner chosen by a 10-member jury who each had 3 points to award. They could divide the points however they wished (i.e. they could award 1 point to three different songs, 1 and 2 points to two songs, or all 3 points to one song).

The 1961 DMGP is noted for the fact that all of Denmark's previous Eurovision representatives – Birthe Wilke, Gustav Winckler, Raquel Rastenni and Katy Bødtger – returned for another try.

At Eurovision
On the night of the final Campeotto performed 13th in the running order, following Norway and preceding eventual contest winners Luxembourg. At the close of voting "Angelique" had received 12 points (8 of which came from Norway), placing Denmark joint 5th (with Italy) of the 16 entries. The Danish jury awarded its highest mark of 4 to Italy.

Voting 
Every country had a jury of ten people. Every jury member could give one point to his or her favourite song.

References 

1961
Countries in the Eurovision Song Contest 1961
Eurovision

da:Dansk Melodi Grand Prix 1961
fo:Dansk Melodi Grand Prix 1961